Philip Francis Murphy (March 25, 1933 – September 2, 1999) was an American clergyman of the Roman Catholic Church. He served as an auxiliary bishop of the Archdiocese of Baltimore from 1976 until his death in 1999.

Early life and education
Philip Murphy was born in Cumberland, Maryland, to Philip and Kathleen (née Huth) Murphy. He received his early education at the parochial school of St. Mary's Church in his native city. After graduating from high school, he attended St. Charles College in Catonsville. He made his theological studies at St. Mary's Seminary in Baltimore, from where he obtained a Bachelor of Arts degree in 1955. He continued his studies at the Pontifical North American College in Rome, and earned a Licentiate of Sacred Theology from the Pontifical Gregorian University in 1959.

Priesthood
While in Rome, Murphy was ordained to the priesthood by Bishop Martin John O'Connor on December 20, 1958. Upon his return to the United States, he was appointed curate at St. Bernardine Church and vocation director at Mount St. Joseph High School, both in Baltimore. He became assistant vice-rector at the North American College in 1961, and was named a papal chamberlain in 1965. Returning to Baltimore, he was made secretary to Cardinal Lawrence Shehan. In addition to his duties as secretary, he was named vice-chancellor of the Archdiocese of Baltimore in 1968, and chancellor of pastoral concerns and vicar for personnel in 1971.

Episcopacy
On January 11, 1976, Murphy was appointed Auxiliary Bishop of Baltimore and Titular Bishop of Tacarata by Pope Paul VI. He received his episcopal consecration on the following February 29 from Archbishop William Donald Borders, with Cardinal Shehan and Bishop Thomas Austin Murphy serving as co-consecrators. In addition to his episcopal duties, he served as vicar general of the archdiocese and vicar to Catholics in Maryland's western counties of Howard, Carroll, Frederick, Washington, Allegany, and Garrett.

Active in interfaith dialogue, Murphy worked improve relations between Catholics and Jews, and served as a board member of The Interfaith Alliance, an organization of Christian and Jewish leaders from across the nation. In 1989, he co-founded Interfaith Housing of Western Maryland, Inc., an organization dedicated to developing safe and adequate housing for Western Maryland's rural poor. Within the National Conference of Catholic Bishops, he served as a member of the Doctrine Committee (1976-1979), Priestly Life & Ministry Committee (1976-1982), Pastoral Research & Practices Committee (1976-1980), Vocations Committee (1977-1980), and Committee on Women in Society and in the Church (1978-1990).

Murphy died from cancer at Mercy Medical Center in Baltimore, at age 66. He is buried in the crypt of the Cathedral of Mary Our Queen.

References

1933 births
1999 deaths
Religious leaders from Cumberland, Maryland
20th-century American Roman Catholic titular bishops
St. Charles College alumni
St. Mary's Seminary and University alumni
Catholics from Maryland